The 1980 Honduran Segunda División was the 14th season of the Honduran Segunda División.  Under the management of Roberto Scalessi, Independiente Villela won the tournament after finishing first in the final round (or Cuadrangular) and obtained promotion to the 1981–82 Honduran Liga Nacional.

Final round
Also known as Cuadrangular.

Standings

Known results

References

Segunda
1980